Kamenín is a village and municipality in the Nové Zámky District in the Nitra Region of south-west Slovakia.

Geography
The village lies at an altitude of 127 metres and covers an area of 28.058 km².

History
In historical records the village was first mentioned in 1183. After the Austro-Hungarian army disintegrated in November 1918, Czechoslovak troops occupied the area, later acknowledged internationally by the Treaty of Trianon. Between 1938 and 1945 Kamenín once more  became part of Miklós Horthy's Hungary through the First Vienna Award. From 1945 until the Velvet Divorce, it was part of Czechoslovakia. Since then it has been part of Slovakia.

Population
It has a population of about 1523 people.
The population is about 1179 Hungarian, 250 Slovak and has 29 Romany and 19 Czech minorities.

Facilities
The village has a Hungarian kindergarten and primary school and a DVD rental store.

Genealogical resources

The records for genealogy are available at the state archive "Statny Archiv in Nitra, Slovakia"

 Roman Catholic Church records (births/marriages/deaths): 1724-1895 (parish A)
 Reformed Church records (births/marriages/deaths): 1784-1953 (parish B)

See also
 List of municipalities and towns in Slovakia

References

External links
https://web.archive.org/web/20070513023228/http://www.statistics.sk/mosmis/eng/run.html
Kamenín – Nové Zámky Okolie
Surnames of living people in Kamenin

Villages and municipalities in Nové Zámky District